Vestel is a Turkish home and professional appliances manufacturing company consisting of 18 companies specialised in electronics, major appliances and information technology. Vestel's headquarters and production plant are located in Manisa, while the company's parent conglomerate is the Istanbul based Zorlu Holding.

Vestel, together with its subsidiary brands has a significant share in the European market of consumer electronics and home appliances, in particular TV sets. As of 2006, Vestel was the largest TV producer in Europe with more than 8 million units sold, accounting for a quarter of the European market. Vestel also has a subsidiary brand Vestfrost, used for white goods, and Luxor, used for televisions, sold in the Nordic countries. In 2014, Vestel entered the smartphone market.

Most TVs produced by Vestel are sold under licensed brand names such as Toshiba, Hitachi, Polaroid, JVC, Bush, Alba and many own brand labels.

In 2021, Vestel Customer Services received two awards from the 4th CX Awards Turkey and one award from the Istanbul Marketing Awards.

History

Originally founded in 1984, Vestel has grown realizing its global potential after joining the Zorlu Group in 1994. Having rapidly accumulated market share, Vestel has attained global significance thanks to its flourishing export activity and enormous production capacity.

See also
Zorlu Holding
List of companies of Turkey

References

External links
Official website

Home appliance manufacturers of Turkey
Home appliance brands
Defence companies of Turkey
Electronics companies of Turkey
Manisa
Electronics companies established in 1984
Manufacturing companies established in 1984
1984 establishments in Turkey
Turkish brands
Companies listed on the Istanbul Stock Exchange
Industrial buildings in Turkey
Multinational companies headquartered in Turkey
Unmanned aerial vehicle manufacturers of Turkey